Sumbatl is a rural locality (a selo) in Kulinsky District, Republic of Dagestan, Russia. The population was 264 as of 2010. There are 5 streets.

Geography 
Sumbatl is located 4 km south of Vachi (the district's administrative centre) by road. Vachi and Kaya are the nearest rural localities.

Nationalities 
Laks live there.

References 

Rural localities in Kulinsky District